Anubhav Sinha (born 22 June 1965) is an Indian film director, producer and writer who works in Hindi films. He is notable for movies like Ra.One, Tum Bin, Dus, Mulk, Article 15 and Thappad.

Early and personal life
Sinha was born in Allahabad, India to Prem Govind Sinha and Sushila Sinha. He went to school in Kalagarh, Garhwal, Government Inter College, Allahabad and Queen's College, Varanasi. Sinha completed his graduation in Mechanical Engineering from The Aligarh Muslim University in 1987.

His wife Ratnaa Sinha is also a director who debuted with the 2017 film Shaadi Mein Zaroor Aana starring Rajkummar Rao and Kriti Kharbanda.

His brother Anupam sinha is also a director who is known for his film Shukriya:_Till_Death_Do_Us_Apart starring Aftab Shivdasani and Shriya Saran.

Career

Sinha worked for two years in New Delhi as a theatre artist before moving to Mumbai on 4 December 1990. He worked as an assistant director to Pankaj Parashar until 1994 before branching out as an independent director for television for Zee TV. He was noticed for his work on Shikast, the flagship show of the TV network in Mumbai. This was followed by the TV show Sea Hawks for UTV. Sea Hawks was the number one show for 35 weeks across all networks. 72 episodes later, he turned to directing music videos.

In 2000, he left working on music videos to start his first feature film Tum Bin. It starred Priyanshu Chatterjee, Sandali Sinha, Himanshu Malik and Raqesh Vashisth. It went on to become a major box-office success and has gained a cult status over the years.

Sinha's second feature Aapko Pehle Bhi Kahin Dekha Hai starred Priyanshu Chatterjee and Sakshi Shivanand. His third film, the multi-starrer  Dus, was the eighth highest grossing film of the year 2005. This was followed by Tathastu (2006) and Cash (2007).

Before directing and producing Tum Bin II and Mulk, Sinha directed Shah Rukh Khan and Kareena Kapoor starrer superhero film, Ra.One for which he wrote the script as well along with Kanika Dhillon.

In 2019, Sinha produced and directed Article 15 under his production house Benaras Media Works with Ayushmann Khurrana in the lead. The film  is based on Article 15 of the Indian Constitution, which is about prohibition of discrimination on grounds of religion, race, caste, sex or place of birth. The film generally received positive reviews from critics, and was a commercial success.

In 2020, Sinha helmed Thappad starring Taapsee Pannu, which released on 28 February 2020, and received highly positive reviews from critics, but was an average success at the box-office.

Sinha is also the founder and owner of Benaras Media Works, the production company which he established in 2012 to produce his films and television projects.

Filmography

Awards and nominations

References

External links
 
 
 

1965 births
Living people
Filmfare Awards winners
21st-century Indian film directors
Hindi-language film directors
Film directors from Mumbai
Aligarh Muslim University alumni